The 64th Hong Kong–Macau Interport was held in Macau on 15 June 2008. Hong Kong captured the champion by winning 1–0.

Squads

Hong Kong 
 Director: Lee Fai Lap
 Administrative Secretary: Joseph Ko
 Head coach:  Goran Paulić
 Assistant coach: Lo Kai Wah
 Goalkeeper coach: Liu Chun Fai
 Physio: Lui Yat Hong
 Assistant: Kwan Kon San

Macau
 Head coach:  Leung Sui Wing

Results

References

Hong Kong–Macau Interport
Macau
Hong